Karawata hostilis is a species of flowering plant in the family Bromeliaceae, endemic to Brazil (the state of Espírito Santo). It was first described in 1972 as Aechmea hostilis.

References

Bromelioideae
Flora of Brazil
Plants described in 1972